Carlos Hartling (2 September 1869 – 13 August 1920) was a German-born composer from Honduras, who composed the music for the national anthem of Honduras, adopted as the country's national anthem in 1915. 

Born in Schlotheim, Schwarzburg-Rudolstadt, his parents were Georg Friedrich Hartlíng and Johanne Henriete Wilhemine Hartling. He studied in the Weimar and Leipzing Conservatory. In September 1896, he went to Tegucigalpa because he had a 27 June 1896 contract to be a music and band teacher. He sang for the first time on 23 September. In 1903, he received the honor of writing the music of a poem written by Augusto Cesar Coello Ramos. He was married to Guadalupe Ferrari Guardiola. Since the second administration of General Manuel Bonilla in February 1912, the lyrics and music were popularized and sung at all official ceremonies.

References 

1869 births
1920 deaths
People from Unstrut-Hainich-Kreis
People from Schwarzburg-Rudolstadt
German emigrants to Honduras
Honduran musicians
National anthem writers